Aiga may refer to:

 American Institute of Graphic Arts, an American professional organization
 Aiga (name), a personal name
 ‘aiga, the Samoan language word for "family"
 Aiga (Achaea), a town of ancient Achaea, Greece